Lee Aronsohn (born December 15, 1952) is an American television writer, composer and producer.

He is the co-creator of the successful TV Show Two and a Half Men. He has written for many sitcoms, such as The Love Boat, Who's the Boss?, Murphy Brown, Grace Under Fire, The Big Bang Theory, and Cybill.

Career
In 1975 he founded the comic book store "Trade-A-Tape Comic Center" in Lincoln, Nebraska, which he ran for two years. , the store is still in operation, under its fourth owner.

In 1997, he co-created the sitcom starring Rick Reynolds and Pam Dawber, Life... and Stuff.

In 2003, he co-created the sitcom Two and a Half Men and wrote the original music for the series as well. Besides writing scripts, Aronsohn has also worked as executive producer and directs one show per season. He is also executive producer and writer for The Big Bang Theory.

In 2018, he released his first feature-length documentary, 40 Years in the Making: The Magic Music Movie, about his efforts to reunite his favorite band from his college years, Magic Music. The movie enjoys a limited theatrical release starting August 3 and was released digitally September 4, 2018.

He is Jewish.

Selected credits

References

External links

1952 births
American television producers
Living people
Showrunners
American television writers
American male television writers
American television composers
Two and a Half Men